The Festival du nouveau cinéma or FNC (English: Festival of New Cinema) is an annual independent film festival held in Montreal, Quebec, Canada, featuring independent films from around the world. Over 160,000 people attend each year. One of the oldest film festivals in Canada, it is an Academy Award-qualifying festival for short films.

History
Founded in 1971, the Festival welcomes Québécois, Canadian, and international filmmakers, and encourages exchanges between industry professionals and the grand public.

Over its history, it has introduced audiences to filmmakers such as François Girard, Atom Egoyan, Denis Villeneuve, Guy Maddin, Léa Pool, Jim Jarmusch, Abbas Kiarostami, Spike Lee, Wim Wenders, Raymond Depardon, Jane Campion, Pedro Almodóvar, Wong Kar-wai, Peter Greenaway, Chantal Akerman and Marguerite Duras.

Sections 

 Compétition internationale highlighting the unique perspectives of the filmmakers who will shape tomorrow's cinema 
 Compétition nationale, homegrown Canadian cinema 
 Temps Ø, the wild bunch or bold cinematic rebels and adventurous films
 Incontournables, the greatest names in cinema
 Les Nouveaux alchimistes, a selection of films pushing the limits, breaking the rules and exploring the boundless creative potential that the medium offers
 Panorama international, international feature films
 Histoire(s) du cinéma, look-backs on the works that have left their mark
 Présentations spéciales, an eclectic section presenting unusual works
 FNC Explore, immersive, interactive and virtual reality programmes that are free and open for all
 FNC Forum, an industry network incubator
 P'tits loups, new cinema for children young and old
 Les Rencontres pancanadiennes du cinéma étudiant or RPCE, a national competition of short student films

Prizes 
 Louve d'or
 Daniel Langlois Innovation Award
 Prix d’interprétation
 Fipresci Prize
 Focus Grand Prize
 Loup argenté - short film
 Grand Prix Focus Short Film
 Temps Ø People's Choice Award
 Nouveaux alchimistes Prize
 Experimentation Award
 Dada Award
 P'tits loups Award

Important moments 
The festival was founded in 1971 by Claude Chamberlan and Dimitri Eipidès. The festival went through several name changes.
1971: Festival international du cinéma en 16mm de Montréal (Montreal International 16mm Film Festival).
1980: Renamed Festival international du nouveau cinéma de Montréal (Montreal International Festival of New Cinema)
1984: Renamed Festival international du nouveau cinéma et de la vidéo de Montréal (Montreal International Festival of New Cinema and Video)
1995: Renamed Nouveau festival international, cinéma, vidéo et nouvelles technologies de Montréal (New Montreal International Festival of Cinema, Video and New Technologies);
1997: Renamed Festival international du nouveau cinéma et des nouveaux médias de Montréal or FCMM (Montreal International Festival of New Cinema and New Media) as a result of the merger with the Festival international du court métrage de Montréal (Montreal International Short Film Festival).
2001: The Festival celebrated its 30th anniversary by offering an extraordinary selection and a commemorative book summarizing the festival's 30-year history.
2004: Adopted the current name Festival du nouveau cinéma (Festival of New Cinema).

FNC and FIFM
In 2004 Daniel Langlois, director of FNC since 1999, left the organization to begin the Festival International de Films de Montréal (known in English as New Montreal FilmFest), which was initiated and created with the support of SODEC (Société de développement des entreprises culturelles) and Telefilm Canada after a dispute between these Canadian government sponsors and the Montreal World Film Festival.

Langlois initially programmed the Festival International de Films de Montréal (FIFM; New Montreal FilmFest) to coincide with the Montreal Festival of New Cinema and New Media (FCMM). According to press reports pertaining to the controversy between the Montreal World Film Festival (WFF/FFM) and the New Montreal FilmFest, Langlois planned to merge the two festivals, but failed to do so when the FCMM refused any such merger. The dates for the inaugural New Montreal FilmFest were ultimately changed to avoid conflicting with the dates of the FCMM.

In 2005, both the FNC and the New Montreal FilmFest came under new management. In early 2006, the New Montreal FilmFest folded after the failure of its inaugural festival. Both the FNC and the Montreal World Film Festival would continue to exist after the demise of the New Montreal FilmFest.

See also
 List of film festivals
 Vancouver International Film Festival
 Toronto International Film Festival
 Fantasia International Film Festival (FanTasia)

References

External links
 FNC Official Web Site
 FCMM: Montreal International Festival of New Cinema and New Media Fondation Daniel Langlois

Film festivals in Montreal
Film festivals established in 1971